The City of Ottawa and the surrounding National Capital Region have an abundance of museums and galleries. Museums range from large national museum with international notoriety, to small galleries and living museums.

National Museums

Other Museums & Galleries

Defunct Museums

See also

 National museums of Canada
 List of museums in Ontario

References

 
Ontario
Museums in Ottawa
Ottawa